is a manga series by Yukari Ichijo serialized in Chorus magazine. In 2007 it won the Excellence Prize for manga at the 11th Japan Media Arts Festival. In 2009, it was adapted into a live-action film starring the American singer and actress Stephanie as the protagonist: the aspiring opera singer Shio Asami.

Plot

References

Manga adapted into films
Shueisha franchises
Shueisha manga
Josei manga
Theatre in anime and manga
Japanese musical drama films